Bristol is a city located in western Day County, South Dakota, United States. It lies in Section 25 of Bristol Township, on the main line of what is now the BNSF Railway alongside U.S. Route 12. The population was 288 at the 2020 census.`

Similar to many towns of the area and of the Midwest in general, Bristol came into being as a result of railroad expansion. The railroad, which first came through the area in the 1870s, identified the site which would become Bristol as Station #70. C.P. Prior, a district railroad surveyor and townsite agent, was given credit for naming Bristol in 1881. He named the town after Bristol, England.

Geography

Bristol is located at  (45.345237, -97.750783).

Bristol has been assigned the ZIP code 57219, and the FIPS place code 07300.

Demographics

2010 census
As of the census of 2010, there were 341 people, 150 households, and 78 families residing in the city. The racial makeup of the city was 98.2% White, 0.3% from other races, and 1.5% from two or more races. Hispanic or Latino of any race were 1.5% of the population.

There were 150 households, of which 18.7% had children under the age of 18 living with them, 44.7% were married couples living together, 3.3% had a female householder with no husband present, 4.0% had a male householder with no wife present, and 48.0% were non-families. 42.7% of all households were made up of individuals, and 21.3% had someone living alone who was 65 years of age or older. The average household size was 1.95 and the average family size was 2.65.

The median age in the city was 52.3 years. 15.2% of residents were under the age of 18; 5.9% were between the ages of 18 and 24; 18.8% were from 25 to 44; 23.8% were from 45 to 64; and 36.4% were 65 years of age or older. The gender makeup of the city was 48.1% male and 51.9% female.

2000 census
As of the census of 2000, there were 377 people, 165 households, and 88 families residing in the city. The population density was 718.0 people per square mile (274.6/km2). There were 186 housing units at an average density of 354.2 per square mile (135.5/km2). The racial makeup of the city was 100.00% White.

There were 165 households, out of which 18.8% had children under the age of 18 living with them, 47.3% were married couples living together, 4.8% had a female householder with no husband present, and 46.1% were non-families. 40.6% of all households were made up of individuals, and 27.3% had someone living alone who was 65 years of age or older. The average household size was 2.01 and the average family size was 2.71.

In the city, the population was spread out, with 18.0% under the age of 18, 6.6% from 18 to 24, 18.0% from 25 to 44, 17.5% from 45 to 64, and 39.8% who were 65 years of age or older. The median age was 54 years. For every 100 females, there were 83.0 males. For every 100 females age 18 and over, there were 82.8 males.

The median income for a household in the city was $32,031, and the median income for a family was $39,375. Males had a median income of $30,208 versus $17,500 for females. The per capita income for the city was $19,006. About 8.7% of families and 6.4% of the population were below the poverty line, including 7.9% of those under age 18 and 7.8% of those age 65 or over.

Popular attractions
 Bristol is the home of the Zucchini Festival each year in the late summer, with fun activities and games centering on the zucchini.
 Bristol is a designated spot on the historic Yellowstone Trail, which at one time was a route for covered wagons marked by yellow paint on rocks and poles.
 Bristol lies in the Glacial Lakes and Prairies region of South Dakota and has excellent fishing opportunities.
 The area surrounding Bristol attracts many hunters from the abundance of wildlife in the area including: white-tailed deer, mule deer, pronghorn antelope, pheasant, quail, many species of ducks, Canada goose, snow goose and dove.
 Bristol also has a city pool, which serves the community and surrounding area.

Notable person
 Tom Brokaw, longtime NBC Nightly News anchor

Gallery

See also

 List of cities in South Dakota

References

External links

 
 Bristol School Homepage
 Online Bristol Newspaper
 Regional Newspaper

Cities in South Dakota
Cities in Day County, South Dakota
Populated places established in 1921
1921 establishments in South Dakota